The 2014 Maryland gubernatorial election took place on November 4, 2014, to elect the Governor and Lieutenant Governor of Maryland. Incumbent Democratic Governor Martin O'Malley was term-limited and could not run for reelection to a third consecutive term.

Gubernatorial candidates pick their running mates, with the two then running together on the same ticket. Primary elections were held on June 24, 2014. The Democrats nominated incumbent lieutenant governor Anthony Brown and Howard County Executive Kenneth Ulman, while the Republicans nominated former State Secretary of Appointments Larry Hogan and former State Secretary of General Services and former Assistant U.S. Secretary of Agriculture for Administration Boyd Rutherford.

Brown predicted that winning the general election would be just "a little bit of a molehill", but he lost to Hogan by a margin of 65,510 votes in the Democratic-leaning state. The Washington Post called the result "a stunning upset" and Republican Governors Association Chairman Chris Christie called it "the biggest upset in the entire country."

Background
Maryland is considered one of the most Democratic states in the country, and Bob Ehrlich, elected in 2002, had been the only Republican elected Governor of Maryland since Spiro Agnew in 1966. Ehrlich was defeated for reelection in 2006 by Baltimore Mayor Martin O'Malley and lost a rematch with O'Malley by a wider margin in 2010.

Democratic primary

Candidates

Declared
 Anthony Brown, Lieutenant Governor of Maryland
Running mate: Kenneth Ulman, Howard County Executive
 Doug Gansler, Attorney General of Maryland
Running mate: Jolene Ivey, State Delegate
 Ralph Jaffe, teacher and perennial candidate
Running mate: Freda Jaffe, sister of Ralph Jaffe
 Heather Mizeur, State Delegate
Running mate: Delman Coates, Senior Pastor of the Mt. Ennon Baptist Church
 Charles U. Smith, perennial candidate
Running mate: Clarence Tucker
 Cindy Walsh, blogger
Running mate: Mary Elizabeth Wingate-Pennacchia

Declined
 John Delaney, U.S. Representative (ran for re-election)
 Peter Franchot, Comptroller of Maryland (ran for re-election)
 Dutch Ruppersberger, U.S. Representative (ran for re-election)
 Kenneth Ulman, Howard County Executive (ran for Lieutenant Governor on Anthony Brown's ticket)

Endorsements

Polling

 ** Internal poll for the Larry Hogan campaign
 * Internal poll for the Anthony Brown campaign
 ^ Internal poll for the Peter Franchot campaign

Results

Republican primary

Candidates

Declared
 David R. Craig, Harford County Executive
Running mate: Jeannie Haddaway, State Delegate
 Ron George, State Delegate
Running mate: Shelley Aloi, banking analyst and former Frederick Alderman
 Larry Hogan, former State Secretary of Appointments
Running mate: Boyd Rutherford, former State Secretary of General Services and former Assistant U.S. Secretary of Agriculture for Administration
 Charles Lollar, former chairman of the Charles County Republican Central Committee and nominee for Maryland's 5th congressional district in 2010
Running mate: Kenneth R. Timmerman, investigative reporter, conservative activist and nominee for Maryland's 8th congressional district in 2012

Disqualified
 Brian Vaeth, businessman, retired firefighter and candidate for the U.S. Senate in 2012
Running mate: Duane "Shorty" Davis, activist

Withdrew
 Blaine Young, president of the Frederick County Board of Commissioners

Declined
 Dan Bongino, former United States Secret Service agent and nominee for the U.S. Senate in 2012 (ran for Congress)
 Nancy Jacobs, state senator
 John R. Leopold, former Anne Arundel County Executive
 Marty Madden, former state senator
 Meyer Marks, political activist
 E. J. Pipkin, Minority Leader of the Maryland Senate and nominee for the U.S. Senate in 2004
 Michael Steele, former lieutenant governor, nominee for the U.S. Senate in 2006 and former chairman of the Republican National Committee

Endorsements

Polling

Results

General election

Candidates
 Larry Hogan (Republican Party), former State Secretary of Appointments
Running mate: Boyd Rutherford, former State Secretary of General Services and former Assistant U.S. Secretary of Agriculture for Administration
 Anthony Brown (Democratic Party), Lieutenant Governor of Maryland
Running mate: Kenneth Ulman, Howard County Executive
 Shawn Quinn (Libertarian Party), candidate for the House of Delegates in 2010
Running mate: Lorenzo Gaztanaga, perennial candidate

Campaign
Hogan heavily criticized Brown for his handling of Maryland's health care exchange as a part of the Affordable Care Act, labeling him as "the most incompetent man in Maryland." The Maryland Health Benefit Exchange enrolled fewer than 4,000 people.

Hogan avoided social issues by promising not to touch the state's abortion or gun control laws. Campaign ads were a significant part of the first debate, culminating in Hogan's call for Brown to "apologize to the women of Maryland for trying to scare them."

Brown pledged no new taxes, no increased taxes, and a look at state spending if elected. Hogan responded by citing O'Malley/Brown's same claim in the 2010 election and how that claim was followed by "40 consecutive tax hikes." Brown said there have been times he has disagreed with O'Malley, like on mortgage reduction. "Brown did not stay to take questions from reporters" and both candidates accused the other of not telling the truth.

Debates
Complete video of debate, October 7, 2014 – C-SPAN
Complete video of debate, October 18, 2014 – YouTube

Predictions

Polling

 * Internal poll for the Larry Hogan campaign

Results

By county
Source:

By congressional district
Hogan won 5 of the state's 8 congressional districts, including 4 that elected Democrats.

See also
 2014 United States elections
 2014 Maryland Attorney General election
 2014 Maryland Comptroller election

References

External links
 Maryland gubernatorial election, 2014 at Ballotpedia

Official campaign websites (archived)
 Larry Hogan for Governor
 Anthony Brown for Governor
 David R. Craig for Governor
 Doug Gansler for Governor
 Ron George for Governor
 Ralph Jaffe for Governor
 Charles Lollar for Governor
 Heather Mizeur for Governor 
 Brian Vaeth for Governor
 Cindy Walsh for Governor

Maryland
Gubernatorial
2014